Jonathan LaPaglia (born 31 August 1969) is an Australian actor and television personality. He has hosted Network 10's revival of Australian Survivor since 2016. As an actor, LaPaglia is known for his roles as Frank B. Parker in the television series Seven Days, Kevin Debreno in The District and Detective Tommy McNamara in New York Undercover.

Early and personal life
LaPaglia was born in Adelaide, South Australia, the youngest of three sons of Maria Johannes (née Brendel), a secretary, originally from the Netherlands and Gedio "Eddie" LaPaglia, an auto mechanic and car dealer from Bovalino, Calabria, Italy. His elder brothers are actor Anthony LaPaglia, and Michael LaPaglia, a car wholesaler in Los Angeles. LaPaglia lives in Santa Monica, California, with his wife Ursula Brooks and daughter.

Career
LaPaglia graduated from Rostrevor College, and then from the University of Adelaide with a MBBS medical degree in 1991. He worked three years as an emergency ward physician in Adelaide, Sydney and London. Feeling restricted, he decided to follow his brother into acting. In 1994, he moved to New York City where he joined the Circle in the Square Theatre School. He got his first break in 1996 when he joined the cast of the television series New York Undercover.

From 1998 until 2001 he played the role of Lt. Frank B. Parker on the science fiction series Seven Days. Afterwards, he played Detective Kevin Debreno, on The District from 2001–2004. LaPaglia has also guest-starred in numerous series including The Sopranos, NCIS, Cold Case and Castle. He appeared in the May 2008 issue of Car Craft magazine with his custom 6.1L Hemi '73 Dodge Challenger.

In 2011, he starred as the protagonist, Hector, in the TV adaptation of Christos Tsiolkas' novel The Slap produced for ABC TV. Although he is Australian, this was LaPaglia's first appearance in an Australian production. Having lived abroad for many years, LaPaglia found it necessary to hire a dialect coach to recover his Australian accent.
His second role in an Australian production was the title character of real-life crime boss Anthony "Rooster" Perish in Channel Nine's Underbelly: Badness, which was the fifth series of the true crime drama franchise. He starred in the 2014 movie The Reckoning alongside Luke Hemsworth.

Since 2016, he has been the host of Network 10's revival of Australian Survivor. In 2020, he was 'inducted' by an unofficial social media page into the "Inaugural Australian Survivor Hall of Fame". LaPaglia is also a sports enthusiast and model.

Filmography

Film

Television

References

External links
 
 

1969 births
20th-century Australian male actors
21st-century Australian male actors
Australian emergency physicians
Australian expatriate male actors in the United States
Australian male film actors
Australian television personalities
Australian male models
Australian male television actors
Australian people of Calabrian descent
Australian people of Dutch descent
Circle in the Square Theatre School alumni
Living people
Male actors from Adelaide
People educated at Rostrevor College
University of Adelaide Medical School alumni
Australian expatriates in England
Australian Survivor